Vaterland means "Fatherland" in German. It may also refer to:

Vaterland, Norway, a neighborhood in Oslo
The ocean liner SS Vaterland, later known as SS Leviathan
Liechtensteiner Vaterland, largest daily newspaper in Liechtenstein
Germany
Das Vaterland, the Austrian Catholic newspaper founded by Leo von Thun-Hohenstein